Bettisfield (standardised: Bettisfield) is a village of about 150 dwellings in Wrexham County Borough, Wales and stands on the Wales-England border, and in the community of Maelor South.  It lies south of the Llangollen Canal on the border with Shropshire, England within the historic English Maelor region which was formerly part of the historic county of Flintshire. The village lies close to Fenn's, Whixall and Bettisfield Mosses, an area of peat bog which was declared a national nature reserve in 1996 because of its importance for wildlife. The English market towns of Whitchurch, Ellesmere and Wem each lie about 6 miles distant to the northeast, west and southeast respectively.

It is described in the Domesday book (1086) within the Cheshire Hundred of Dudeston, recording 28 households and a value to Lord Edwin in 1066 of £18 9s, reducing to £3 in 1086.

The village no longer has a shop, post office, pub, smithy or baker.

Notes

References

Villages in Wrexham County Borough
Communities in Wrexham County Borough